The North Carolina Central Eagles football program is a college football team representing North Carolina Central University. The Eagles play at the NCAA Division I Football Championship Subdivision (FCS) level as a member of the Mid-Eastern Athletic Conference.

History

Classifications
1952–1972: NCAA College Division
1955–1969: NAIA
1970–1986: NAIA Division I
1973–2010: NCAA Division II
2011–present: NCAA Division I–AA/FCS

Conference memberships
 1922–1927: Independent
 1928–1970: Central Intercollegiate Athletic Association
 1971–1978: Mid-Eastern Athletic Conference
 1979–2006: Central Intercollegiate Athletic Association
 2007–2009: NCAA Division II independent
 2010–present: Mid-Eastern Athletic Conference

Championships

National

Conference Championships

Division I Football Championship Subdivision (FCS)
2022 MEAC Football Co-Champions
 2016 MEAC Football Champions.
 2015 MEAC Football Co-Champions.
 2014 MEAC Football Co-Champions.

Division II
 2006 Central Intercollegiate Athletics Association Football Champions.  
 2005 Central Intercollegiate Athletics Association Champions
 1980 Central Intercollegiate Athletics Association Champions

Alumni in the NFL
Over 25 North Carolina Central alumni have played in the NFL, including:
John Baker
Louis Breeden
William Frizzell
Robert Massey
Doug Wilkerson
Aaron B. Martin, Sr
Ryan Smith
Greg Peterson

Playoff appearances

NCAA Division II
The Eagles made three appearances in the Division II playoffs, with a combined record of 1-3.

References

External links
 

 
American football teams established in 1922
1922 establishments in North Carolina